The Port of Port Arthur is a seaport in Port Arthur, Texas (United States).

2010 tanker collision

On 23 January 2010, an oil tanker and barge collided in the channel leading to Port Arthur, spilling up to 450,000 gallons of oil into the seaway.  The tanker was chartered by ExxonMobil and was bound for Exxon's refinery in Beaumont, Texas.

References

External links

Sabine–Neches Waterway
Gulf Intracoastal Waterway

Port Arthur